Yusuf Kurçenli (1947 – 22 February 2012) was a Turkish film director, producer and screenwriter. 

Kurçenli was born in Çayeli, Rize Province, Turkey.  He studied journalism at Istanbul University. Between 1973 and 1980, he worked as a director and producer at TRT, the Turkish public television. His debut film was Ve Recep Ve Zehra Ve Ayşe in 1983. He followed that with many long features including the celebrated 1994 film Çözülmeler that won many awards at film festivals. He also directed Baba Evi and Kurşun Kalem. His last film was Yüreğine Sor. He was diagnosed with cancer the same year and died in Istanbul aged 65, after having been ailing from the disease for one-and-a-half years.

Awards
1990: "Best Film" at the 9th Istanbul Film Festival
1994: "best Director" at the 13th Istanbul Film Festival for Çözülmeler
1994: "Best Film" at the 16th Turkish Film Writers Awards for Çözülmeler
1995: "Best Director" and "Best Original Screenplay" at the 7th Ankara Film Festival for Çözülmeler

Filmography

Director
1977: Özgürlüğün Bedeli
1978: At Gözlüğü
1979: Savunma
1983: Ve Recep Ve Zehra Ve Ayşe
1984: Ölmez Ağacı1986: Merdoğlu Ömer Bey1987: Gramofon Avrat1989: Gönül Garip Bir Kuştur1990: Raziye1990: Karartma Geceleri1992: Taşların Sırrı1993: Umut Taksi 
1994: Çözülmeler 1994 
1995: Aşk Üzerine Söylenmemiş Her şey1997: Antika Talanı1999: Baba Evi2000: Çemberler2000: Kurşun Kalem2002: Gönderilmemiş Mektuplar2006: Bebeğim2008: Gurbet Kuşları2010: Yüreğine SorProducer
1994: ÇözülmelerScreenwriter
1979: Savunma1983: Ve Recep Ve Zehra Ve Ayşe1984: Ölmez Ağacı1986: Merdoğlu Ömer Bey1987: Gramofon Avrat1989: Gönül Garip Bir Kuştur1990: Karartma Geceleri1990: Raziye1994: Çözülmeler1995: Aşk Üzerine Söylenmemiş Her şey2002: Gönderilmemiş Mektuplar''

References

External links

[ Sinema Turk: Yusuf Kurçenli]

Turkish film directors
Turkish male screenwriters 
1947 births
2012 deaths
People from Çayeli
Vefa High School alumni
Istanbul University alumni
Turkish film producers
20th-century Turkish screenwriters
21st-century Turkish screenwriters
Deaths from cancer in Turkey
Best Director Golden Boll Award winners